Antiqua is a style of typeface used to mimic styles of handwriting or calligraphy common during the 15th and 16th centuries.  Letters are designed to flow and strokes connect together in a continuous fashion; in this way it is often contrasted with Fraktur-style typefaces where the individual strokes are broken apart.  The two typefaces were used alongside each other in the germanophone world, with the Antiqua–Fraktur dispute often dividing along ideological or political lines.  After the mid-20th century, Fraktur fell out of favor and Antiqua-based typefaces became the official standard.

History 
Antiqua typefaces are typefaces designed between 1470 and 1600 AD, specifically those by Nicolas Jenson and the Aldine roman commissioned by Aldus Manutius and cut by Francesco Griffo. The letterforms were based on a synthesis of Roman inscriptional capitals and Carolingian writing. Florentine poet Petrarch was one of the few medieval authors to have touched on the handwriting of his time; in two letters he criticized the current scholastic hand, with its protracted strokes and exuberant letter-forms amusing the eye from a distance, but fatiguing on closer exposure, as if written for other purpose than to be read. For Petrarch the gothic hand violated three principles: writing, he said, should be simple, clear and orthographically correct. 

A more thorough reform of handwriting than the Petrarchan compromise was in the offing. The generator of the new style (illustration) was Poggio Bracciolini, a tireless pursuer of ancient manuscripts, who developed the new humanist script in the first decade of the 15th century. 

Berthold Ullman identifies the watershed moment in the development of the new humanistic hand as the youthful Poggio's transcription of Cicero's Epistles to Atticus.

The new script was embraced and developed by the Florentine humanists and educators Niccolò de' Niccoli and Coluccio Salutati. The neat, sloping, humanist cursive invented by the Florentine humanist de' Niccoli in the 1420s and disseminated through his numerous scholars is usually characterized as essentially a rapid version of the same script. Rhiannon Daniels writes, however, that "this was not humanistic bookhand written cursively, but a running script written with a very fine pen; a modification of contemporary gothic chancery script influenced by humanistic bookhand; hence it is sometimes known as ". 

In the late fifteenth century this "chancery script in the Antique manner" was further developed by humanists in Rome. Calligraphic forms of this "chancery italic" were popularized by the famous Roman writing master Ludovico Arrighi in the early sixteenth century. In the history of Western typography, humanist minuscule gained prominence as a basis for the typesetter's roman typeface, as it was standardized by Aldus Manutius, who introduced his revolutionary italic typeface based on the chancery hand in Venice, 1501, and practiced by designer-printers Nicolas Jenson and Francesco Griffo, respectively; this is the reason why they are also known as Venetian types and occasionally as old style, differentiated from modern styles by the more or less uniform thickness of all strokes and by slanted serifs. 

Roman type has helped establish the remarkable resistance to change of the modern Latin alphabet. The term "Antiqua" later came to sometimes be used for Roman type in general as opposed to blackletter, as in the Antiqua–Fraktur dispute in the German-speaking world.

Designers
 Berne Nadall (1869–1932), American designer, created Caslon Antique (1896–98)
 Peter Behrens (1868–1940), German architect and graphic designer, created Behrens Antiqua (1907–1909)
 Vojtěch Preissig (1873–1944), Czech designer influential in the areas of book and type design, created Preissig Antiqua (1923–25) specifically for the Czech language
 Paul Renner (1878–1956), created Renner Antiqua (1939). Renner also created the typeface Futura.
 Hermann Zapf (1918–2015), created Zapf Renaissance Antiqua (1984–87). Created many other fonts over the years.

Forms and types
Blackletter Antiqua's Germanic opposite is blackletter, in which the letter forms are broken or fractured. In 19th- and 20th-century Germany there was a dispute over whether German should be written in Antiqua or the highly developed Fraktur blackletter. In 1911, the German Reichstag rejected an official switch to Antiqua by only three votes: 85 to 82. Hitler expressed a desire to switch to Antiqua as early as 1934; however it took until 1941 for the transition to be made law, when Martin Bormann issued a decree switching to usage of international scripts such as Antiqua. 
Preissig Antiqua Made by Vojtěch Preissig (1873–1944), a type designer and writer.

Renner Antiqua Made by Paul Renner, Revived by Patrick Strietzel (1939) Crafted at D. Stempel AG Foundry.

Zapf Renaissance Antiqua Made by Hermann Zapf, Typeface Designer.

Gallery

See also
 Script typeface
 Bembo
 History of Western typography
 Record type
 Roman type
 Typography
 Old-style figures

References

   The Dover edition is an abridged and corrected republication of the work originally published in 1950 by Prentice-Hall, Inc. under the title Lettering: The History and Technique of Lettering as Design.

Typography
1470s
Old style serif typefaces